Arbi is both a surname and a given name. Notable people with the name include:

Surname:
Hariyanto Arbi (born 1972), Indonesian badminton player
Hastomo Arbi (born 1958), Indonesian badminton player

Given name:
Arbi Barayev (1973–2001), Chechen warlord
Arbi Sanit (1939–2021), Indonesian politic scientist
Arbi Xhelo, Albanian businessman